Frazer McHugh (born 14 July 1981) is an English professional footballer who last played for Gedling Town in the East Midlands Counties Football League, where he plays as a midfielder.

External links

Frazer McHugh career stats at Swindon-Town-FC.co.uk

1981 births
Living people
Footballers from Nottingham
English footballers
Swindon Town F.C. players
Bromsgrove Rovers F.C. players
Tamworth F.C. players
Gainsborough Trinity F.C. players
Halesowen Town F.C. players
Bradford City A.F.C. players
Notts County F.C. players
Hucknall Town F.C. players
Redditch United F.C. players
Belper Town F.C. players
Gedling Town F.C. players
Association football midfielders
English Football League players
Northern Counties East Football League players